Südaue (in its upper course: Levester Bach) is a river of Lower Saxony, Germany. It flows into the Westaue west of Wunstorf.

See also
List of rivers of Lower Saxony

References

Rivers of Lower Saxony
Rivers of Germany